Siegelaar is a surname. Notable people with the surname may include:

 Olivier Siegelaar (born 1986), Dutch rower
 Sarah Siegelaar (born 1981), Dutch rower